Bruce Lee: A Dragon Story  also known as The Bruce Lee Story, Super Dragon: The Bruce Lee Story and Bruce Lee Story: Super Dragon) is a 1974 Bruceploitation film starring Bruce Li. The film is a loose  biopic about martial arts actor Bruce Lee and centers on his supposed affair with actress Betty Ting-Pei.  The film is notable for being the first biopic of Bruce Lee (it was released the year following his death), the debut film of notorious Lee imitator Bruce Li, and the first film in the Bruceploitation genre.

Plot
The film attempts to chronicle Bruce Lee's career from his The Green Hornet days up to the time of his death. The film opens with a pre-fame Bruce Lee (Bruce Li) delivering newspapers in Seattle, Washington.  Lee then becomes a martial arts teacher. Lee competes in a martial arts tournament and wins. After the match he is offered the role of the Kato in The Green Hornet.  He marries Linda Lee Caldwell and they have 2 children together.

Later, Lee goes to Hong Kong. He turns down a contract from Shaw Brothers due to a pay dispute. The wife of director Lo Wei offers Lee a contract at Golden Harvest which he accepts. Lee makes his first film which becomes very successful at the box office. At a celebration event Lee meets actress Betty Ting-Pei. The two later fall in love. Bruce does his second film which is another success at the box office. Lee turns down Lo Wei's next film offer and opts to direct his next film himself. While on set Lee begins to experience severe headaches. Betty reveals to Bruce that she is pregnant. Later Linda arrives in Hong Kong to visit Bruce. Bruce decides to get a divorce and be with Betty. One night while Betty is making dinner Bruce suffers a headache and Betty tells him to take a nap. Later when Betty tries to wake Lee she finds him dead.

Reviews
A review by the website, cityonfire.com gave the film 4 out of 10. The reviewer said "Make no mistake, "Bruce Lee: A Dragon Story" is a terrible Bruceploitation movie. The shits and giggles come automatically due to the horrendous dubbing (it's so bad, it's good!) and all that other cheesy retro stuff". He also said that at the same time, he enjoyed trash-cinema like Bruce Lee: A Dragon Story so  his rating was based more on the average chop-socky viewer than a "Bruce Li whore", as he was.

Releases

Cast
 Bruce Li as Bruce Lee
 Cheng Fu-Hung as Da Jung, thug 
 Chin Yung-Hsiang as Sir Run Run Shaw
 Ngai Yat-Ping as Japanese Sword Master
 Woo Hon-Cheung as party guest
 Anne Winton
 Shih Ting-Ken (extra)
 Tsang Ming-Cheong (extra)
 Robert Tai (extra)
 Suen Shu-Pau (extra)

Stunts
 Chen Chin-Hai (coordinator)

References

External links
 

1974 films
1974 martial arts films
Bruceploitation films
Films about Bruce Lee
Hong Kong martial arts films
1970s Hong Kong films
1980s Hong Kong films